The men's 500 metres in short track speed skating at the 2018 Winter Olympics took place on 20 and 22 February 2018 at the Gangneung Ice Arena in Gangneung, South Korea. Wu Dajing of China set an Olympic record (heat) and 2 world records (quarterfinal and final) while leading wire-to-wire in all 3 contests en route to capturing the gold.

Records
Prior to this competition, the existing world and Olympic records were as follows.

Three Olympic records and two world records were set during the competition.

Results

Heats
 Q – qualified for the quarterfinals
 ADV – advanced
 PEN – penalty

Quarterfinals
 Q – qualified for the semifinals
 ADV – advanced
 PEN – penalty

Semifinals
 QA – qualified for Final A
 QB – qualified for Final B

Final B

Final A
The final was held on 22 February 2018 at 20:15.

References

Men's short track speed skating at the 2018 Winter Olympics